The Essex Leopards, or just Leopards as they were more commonly known, was a British basketball team competing in the British Basketball League. Established in 1994, the Leopards franchise was one of the most successful teams of the 1990s, dominating the domestic scene with local rivals London Towers.

Originally playing out of the London Arena as Leopards and later Greater London Leopards, the team was moved to Brentwood in 1999, and in 2002 the name was changed to the Essex Leopards. For financial reasons the team decided to "sit out" the 2003–04 season of the BBL and while every effort was made to find a buyer for the franchise, the Leopards soon folded completely.

Season-by-season records

New team
This was not the end though, as in 2004 a merger took place between Ware Rebels and Leopards Alive (an organisation of supporters of the defunct Greater London Leopards), and renamed as the Essex & Herts Leopards. In 2006, the team was renamed again to London Leopards, and currently play in EBL Division 1, the league below the BBL.

See also
Essex Leopards

References

Basketball teams established in 1994
Basketball teams disestablished in 2003
Defunct basketball teams in the United Kingdom
Basketball teams in London
Former British Basketball League teams
1994 establishments in England
1994 disestablishments in England
Brentwood (Essex town)
Sport in Essex